"Count Me In" is a song by American rock band 311. It is the second single from their tenth studio album, Universal Pulse. The single is a radio-only single and it was released on October 4, 2011.

Reception
CultureBully calls the song "another stellar 311 track". Boston.com praises Tim Mahoney's guitar work in the song, saying he "creates some bright spots when freed up to mess with the tones and textures".

Charts

References

311 (band) songs
2011 singles
Song recordings produced by Bob Rock
Songs written by Nick Hexum
Songs written by SA Martinez
2011 songs